Paradh is a Marathi movie released on 17 August 2010.The movie is produced by Anuradha S. Talati and directed by Gajendra Ahire.

Cast 

The cast includes
Makarand Anaspure as Ambadas
Siddharth Jadhav as Yeshwant
Ravi Kale as Vithal
Vrinda Gajendra  as (sister in law) & Others.
Vinay Apte as Prataprao

Soundtrack
The music is provided by Rahul Ranade.

References

External links 
 

2010 films
2010s Marathi-language films